Ivan Strack (born 1991) is a Russian serial killer, responsible for the murders of two underage girls in 2005, while he was still a minor, and also another killing committed 12 years later, for which he was given 22 years imprisonment. Strack also confessed to killing his grandfather in December 2003, but this claim hasn't been conclusively proven.

Early life
Born into a family with German roots, Strack lived his with his mother and older brother, a security guard, as his father lived separately from them and rarely saw Ivan. At school, he was described as a handsome, well-mannered boy with a nerdy appearance, although a rather quiet one. In November 2004, his mother died suddenly, and little Ivan was taken under the care of his older brother, who took full custody of him. It's unclear how this tragedy affected Strack, but it presumably had a taxing effect on his psyche.

Murders

Andrei Strack
Andrei Andreyevich Strack, Ivan's 64-year-old grandfather, had a past littered with crime: since around the mid-1960s of the Soviet era, he was tried for several types of crimes, including hooliganism, possession of weapons and drugs (a rare offence for that time). After the regime's fall, Andrei began running a legitimate business as the owner of a parking lot, but rumors persisted that he had illegally acquired a number of cafes and enterprises around the city.

On December 6, 2004, the former convict was brutally murdered in his apartment. According to the investigators, Andrei likely knew his killer, as he had opened his door to them; it was highly unlikely to be a break-in, as his door was equipped with magnets and was opened using a remote control. The elder Strack had suffered injuries to the back of his head and his occipital lobe, inflicted with a sharp weapon, as he was likely bled out on the carpet after being struck. Upon discovery by his sibling Nikolai and his wife Nelly, a large kitchen knife covered in blood was found lying nearby, the walls stained with blood, along with the grim detail of Andrei's fingers being cut off. Robbery was ruled out as a motive, as a massive gold chain, an expensive watch and two signet rings were found laying on a table next to the body.

According to Ivan's confession, on that day he had visited his grandfather to exchange some videotapes. During his stay there, the two started a trivial argument over some buckwheat porridge, which Ivan had dropped on the carpet, along with a plate. After allegedly killing Andrei, Ivan continued to live on as if nothing had happened, even acquiring a newspaper article about the murder from a classmate who had brought it to school. Out of respect, the other student handed it over to the supposedly grieving grandson.

Doubt was quickly cast over this confession, as it was likely that Andrei - a tall, healthy man weighing around 120 kilograms - would've been able to prevent his 14-year-old attacker from harming him just by raw strength. Authorities interpreted it as Strack just taking the blame for a crime he hadn't committed, a theory supported by his relatives.

Katya Shkurko and Anya Shibaeva
Both students of the 10th-secondary school, the 13-year-old Katya was a love interest for Ivan, who also studied in the school. She was considered his girlfriend by her classmates, as they often talked together, with Strack also visiting her house. At some point, she broke up with him, and they no longer saw each other as often.

On March 6, 2005, Shkurko was called by Strack so they could take a walk through the forest, to which she agreed, bringing the 11-year-old Anya along. The trio were together for a long time, taking in the beautiful surrounding scenery and talking to each other. At some point, Strack pulled out a knife and starting stabbing Katya a total of 10 times in the face, neck and chest. Frightened, Shibaeva ran away in horror, but Ivan caught up to her and stabbed her 4 times until she was dead. He then hid the body behind some bushes, and stole both of the girls' phones, which he had wanted to have for a long time.

The following day, Shkurko's body was found by a retired military doctor named Nikolai Kirilenko, who had a country house in the area. He immediately realized that she was dead, and called the authorities, who soon found Shibaeva's body around 10 meters away. Noting that their phones were missing, police started an investigation into the possible clues, which led them back to Ivan Strack, who had put up one of the phones for sale. While conducting a search of his home, the other phone was also located. Soon after, the young Strack confessed to the murders in detail, without much of an expression, including that of his grandfather. Soon after the events, he was sent off to a psychiatric hospital in Tula, where he would remain for another 12 years.

Ekaterina Frolova
In 2017, Strack was released from prison, and started work in a salon. His workplace was shared with a store, where 20-year-old Ekaterina Frolova worked. It is alleged that Ivan might've developed feelings for Frolova, but he only confessed to wanting her phone. He was also mad at her, as she hadn't paid him for some kind of repairing he had done. Brandishing a knife, on July 8, he broke into Ekaterina's apartment and killed her, also attacking her 19-year-old Anastasia Khlebnikova. Strack was arrested on the spot, and again confessed to his crimes. On this instance, he was given 22 years imprisonment, which are to be served at an undisclosed psychiatric hospital in Tula.

External links
 News report on Strack's arrest (in Russian)

See also
 List of Russian serial killers

References

1991 births
Living people
Male serial killers
Minors convicted of murder
People convicted of murder by Russia
People from Vyborg
Prisoners and detainees of Russia
Russian male criminals
Russian murderers of children
Russian people of German descent
Russian serial killers